John Ayers Merritt (January 26, 1926 – December 13, 1983) was a head football coach at Jackson State University and Tennessee State University.  He was inducted into the College Football Hall of Fame in 1994.

He was born in Falmouth, Kentucky, and is an alumnus of Kentucky State University, where he played guard on the football team from 1947 to 1949. He earned the nickname "Big John". He graduated in 1950 and earned a master's degree from the University of Kentucky in 1952.

He coached Jackson State University from 1953 to 1962, where he compiled a record of 63–37–5.  Merritt led Jackson State to back-to-back appearances in the Orange Blossom Classic in 1961 and 1962 before being hired by what was then Tennessee A&I.

At Tennessee State (as Tennessee A&I was renamed in 1968),  Merritt had four undefeated seasons, claimed four Midwest Athletic Association titles, seven black college football national championships: (1965, 1966, 1970, 1971, 1973, 1979 and 1982) and earned the school's first-ever NCAA Division I-AA playoff victory in 1982.

Merritt coached many players who went into the National Football League, among them were Ed "Too Tall" Jones, Joe Gilliam, Claude Humphrey, Mike Hegman, and Richard Dent.
His coaching record at Tennessee State was 172–33–7, and had an .828 winning percentage—far and away the best in school history.

John Merritt Boulevard in Nashville, Tennessee is named in his honor. The Tennessee State football team usually opens every home season with the John Merritt Classic game at Nissan Stadium, traditionally against Alabama A&M University but more recently the Classic has also headlined other HBCU teams, for example in 2015 Tennessee State hosted the Alabama State University on September 6.

Head coaching record

See also
 List of college football coaches with 200 wins

References

External links
 
 

1926 births
1983 deaths
American football guards
Kentucky State Thorobreds football players
Jackson State Tigers football coaches
Tennessee State Tigers football coaches
College Football Hall of Fame inductees
People from Pendleton County, Kentucky
Players of American football from Kentucky
African-American coaches of American football
African-American players of American football
20th-century African-American sportspeople